Varijashree Venugopal born in Bangalore, India on 6 March 1991 is an Indian singer and flautist.

Early life 

Varijashree was born to an Indian Brahmin family of HS Venugopal and TV Rama both accomplished musicians. She was found to have the rare ability to identify about 40 ragas at the tender age of one and a half and about 200 ragas at the age of 4. She was initially trained by her father. Varijashree began undergoing formal training in Carnatic music under Vidhushi H. Geetha at the age of 4. She has also been learning a few rare compositions from Vidhushi Vasantha Srinivasan and Vidwan D.S. Srivatsa. At present she has been learning higher music lessons under the tutelage of Gaanakalanidhi Vidwan Salem P. Sundaresan. She has also been undergoing flute training under her father Vid. H. S. Venugopal from the past twelve years. She gave her first rendering at the Bangalore Gayana Samaja at the age of seven.

Varijashree is part of the famous Quartet fusion band from Bangalore "Chakrafonics" along with talented musicians Praveen D Rao, Ajay Warrier and Pramath Kiran. Chakrafonics is famous for its unique blend of traditional classical music with other genres of music.

Awards

Albums 

Varijashree has music albums ‘Arpana’ and ‘Upasana’, and the recently released ‘Mela raga malika’, ‘Bidiru’ and ‘Kaayo enna gopala’ to her credit. She has scored music for the documentary films like ‘Ashtaavadhaana’ directed by Vid. Shataavadhani Dr.R.Ganesh, short films 'Chiguru' and 'Little Treasures' directed by Sri Karthik and Sri Vivek Aaraga. She is featured in several tracks on "Sensurround", the third album of the Italian group "Trio Bobo", a side of the Italian progressive group Elio e le storie tese

References

1991 births
Living people
Singers from Bangalore
Indian flautists
Indian women singer-songwriters
Indian women classical singers
Women flautists
Women musicians from Karnataka
21st-century Indian women singers
21st-century Indian singers
21st-century flautists